Libowitz is a surname. People with the surname include:

People
 Nehemiah Samuel Libowitz (1862–1939), Hebrew scholar and author
 Sig Libowitz (born 1968), American lawyer and actor

Fictional characters
 Mr. Libowitz, one of the characters in the movie 3 Strikes (film)

Hebrew-language surnames